56 Pine Street – originally known as the Wallace Building after its developer, James Wallace – at 56-58 Pine Street between Pearl and William Streets in the Financial District of Manhattan, New York City, was built in 1893-94 and was designed by Oscar Wirz in the Romanesque Revival style.

The building's facade consists of brick, stone and terra cotta and features colonnettes, deeply inset windows and rounded arched openings.  The flowered panels and fantastic heads which embellish the building is "some of the finest Byzantine carving in New York."

The building was designated a New York City landmark in 1997 and was added to the National Register of Historic Places in 2003. It is also a contributing property to the Wall Street Historic District, a NRHP district created in 2007.

See also
List of New York City Designated Landmarks in Manhattan below 14th Street
National Register of Historic Places listings in Manhattan below 14th Street

References
Notes

External links

Office buildings on the National Register of Historic Places in Manhattan
Commercial buildings completed in 1894
Financial District, Manhattan
New York City Designated Landmarks in Manhattan
Romanesque Revival architecture in New York City
Historic district contributing properties in Manhattan